Sanskriti University is a private university located in Mathura, Uttar Pradesh, India.

Academics
Like all private universities in India, the university recognized by the University Grants Commission (UGC) and by the local government.

Campus 
The university in Mathura is spread across 40 acres of land, including a library, computer lab, faculty rooms, seminar hall and centre of excellence (robotics & automation) in collaboration with MSME. Considered by industry experts as one of the most well-staffed and equipped with resources university in Mathura, Sanskriti is an excellent breeding ground for young entrepreneurs.

Schools and institutes
The university includes the following schools and institutes:
 School of Engineering & Information Technology
 School of Agriculture
 School of Tourism and Hospitality
 School of Management & Commerce
 School of Education
 School of Fashion and Fine Arts
 School of Rehabilitation
 School of Humanities & Social Science
 Sanskriti Ayurvedic Medical College & Hospital
 Sanskriti Unani Medical College & Hospital
 School of Pharmacy & Research Centre
 Institute of Pharmaceutical Sciences
 School of Medical & Allied Sciences
 School of Basic & Applied Sciences
 School of Yoga & Naturopathy
 School of Law and Legal Studies
 University Polytechnic

References

External links

Private universities in Uttar Pradesh
Education in Mathura
Educational institutions established in 2016
2016 establishments in Uttar Pradesh
Engineering colleges in Uttar Pradesh
Agricultural universities and colleges in Uttar Pradesh
Private engineering colleges in India